FC Lusitanos, also known as Lusitans, was an Andorran football club from Andorra la Vella which was founded in 1999 and currently play in Segona Divisió.

Lusitanos won their first Primera Divisió title in 2011–12 and its second national championship the following season. The club's name, crest and kit reflect its Portuguese identity.

The club's final season was the 2019-2020 season in the Segona Divisió.

History
Futbol Club Lusitanos (Futbol Club Lusitans, Portuguese: Futebol Club Lusitanos) was founded in 1999. The club played for the first time in the Campionat de Lliga in 2000–01, after winning the Second Division championship. In 2001–02 they won its first title, the Copa Constitució after winning 2–0 in the final against Inter Club d'Escaldes on 2 June, with both goals by Manuel Vieira.

Lusitanos played their first European matches in the 2010–11 UEFA Europa League, where they were eliminated 11–0 on aggregate by Macedonian club Rabotnicki. In the following season's tournament, they were beaten at the same stage by Croatian club Varaždin, 6–1 on aggregate.

Since their promotion to the top division they have not been relegated, and won their first title in 2011–12. This qualified the club to the 2012–13 UEFA Champions League, where they were knocked out 9–1 on aggregate in the first qualifying round by Maltese champions Valletta.

They won their second league title in 2013, this qualified the club to the 2013–14 UEFA Champions League they were drawn to play EB/Streymur of the Faroe Islands, in the first leg they drew 2–2 and in the second leg they lost 5–1, losing 7–3 on aggregate.

After finishing fourth in the regular season FC Lusitanos ended the 2013–14 season without being qualified for the UEFA Europa League after losing against Sant Julià 1–2 in the final of the 2014 Copa Constitució.

In the 2014–15 season FC Lusitanos became runners-up of the regular league and this qualified the club to the 2015–16 UEFA Europa League where they were drawn to face West Ham United in the first qualifying round, lost 0–3 in the away match and 0–1 at home (0–4 on aggregate).

Identity and support
FC Lusitanos' logo greatly resembles that of the Portuguese Football Federation. Since its founding, the club has had several Portuguese players and coaches. The supporters, known as Lusitanos or Lusos, are mainly Portuguese immigrants in Andorra or Andorran people of Portuguese heritage.

The team's kit manufacturer is the Portuguese brand Peba.

* Since the Andorra Football Federation affiliation.

Honours
Primera Divisió:
Winners (2): 2011–12, 2012–13
Runners-up (2): 2014–15, 2015–16
Copa Constitució:
Winners (1): 2002
Runners-up (3): 2008, 2009, 2012, 2014
Supercopa Andorrana:
Winners (2): 2012, 2013
Segona Divisió:
Winners (1): 1999–00

League history

European results

European record

Current squad

References

External links
FC Lusitanos Official website (archived 22 December 2015)
Lusitanos at UEFA
Lusitanos at Weltfussball
Lusitanos at Football-Lineups

 
Football clubs in Andorra
Sport in Andorra la Vella
Association football clubs established in 1999
1999 establishments in Andorra
Association football clubs disestablished in 2020
2020 disestablishments in Andorra
Diaspora sports clubs
Portuguese diaspora in Europe